Dr. Babasaheb Ambedkar Marathwada University Stadium is a multipurpose stadium located in Dr. Babasaheb Ambedkar Marathwada University Campus, Aurangabad, Maharashtra. The stadium is managed and owned by Dr. Babasaheb Ambedkar Marathwada University.
The stadium has facilities for cricket, football, and hockey. In addition, there is a swimming pool and a velodrome.

There are also facilities for indoor sports such as basketball, badminton, gymnastics, handball, volleyball, lawn tennis, table tennis, weight lifting, and Kabbadi.

The stadium hosted one first-class match, in 1973 when Maharashtra cricket team played against Bombay cricket team, but since then the stadium has not hosted any cricket matches.

References

External links
Cricinfo profile
Cricketarchive.com
 BAMU Webside

Sports venues in Maharashtra
Buildings and structures in Aurangabad, Maharashtra
Cricket grounds in Maharashtra
Multi-purpose stadiums in India
Sport in Aurangabad, Maharashtra
Sports venues completed in 1989
1989 establishments in Maharashtra
20th-century architecture in India